James Barbour McAlpine (19 October 1901 – May 1975), sometimes known as J. B. McAlpine or Mutt McAlpine, was a Scottish amateur footballer who played as an inside left for Queen's Park in the Scottish Football League. He is Queen's Park's record goalscorer and second-highest appearance-maker, having scored 192 goals in 547 appearances in all competitions. He later served on the club's committee and as president. In September 2013, Queen's Park's new youth and community building at Lesser Hampden was named the "J. B. McAlpine Pavilion".

Despite being ineligible for the full Scottish international team under the rules of the time due to being born in England, McAlpine represented Scotland at amateur level, and also represented the Scottish League XI and the Glasgow Football Association (five appearances in the annual match against Sheffield), selection for which was not dependent on birthplace.

Honours 
Queen's Park
 Scottish Football League Division Two: 1922–23

References

1901 births
1975 deaths
Scottish footballers
Scottish Football League players
Scottish Football League representative players
Association football outside forwards
Association football inside forwards
Queen's Park F.C. players
Footballers from Greater London
Queen's Park F.C. non-playing staff
Scotland amateur international footballers
Anglo-Scots
Outfield association footballers who played in goal